Torben Wosik is a male former international table tennis player from Germany.

He won a silver medal at the 2004 World Team Table Tennis Championships in the Swaythling Cup (men's team event) with Timo Boll, Zoltan Fejer-Konnerth, Jörg Roßkopf, and Christian Süß for Germany.

He also won four European Table Tennis Championships medals from 2000 until 2003.

See also
 List of table tennis players
 List of World Table Tennis Championships medalists

References

1973 births
Living people
German male table tennis players
Sportspeople from Hamm
Olympic table tennis players of Germany